The 2010 Victory Bowl was a college football post-season bowl game.  The game was played on November 20, 2010 between North Greenville University and Campbellsville University at Younts Stadium in Tigerville, South Carolina.

Campbellsville's offense achieved 460 yards in 100 plays compared to North Greenville's 352 yards.  Campbellsville dominated the air with 333 passing yards but only reached the end zone twice.  The final score was North Greenville 42, Campbellsville 16.

References 

Victory Bowl
Victory Bowl
Victory Bowl
Campbellsville Tigers football bowl games
North Greenville Crusaders football bowl games
Victory Bowl
Victory Bowl